Chandigarh Dynamos are a Premier Hockey League team based in Chandigarh, Punjab. The team captain is Rajpal Singh.

History
During the 2004 season, the Chandigarh Dynamos played in tier 2. Their goalkeeper Gurkirat Mann was adjudged the best goalkeeper for the 2004 season. Following their win, they were promoted to tier 1, where they finished runners-up in the 2006 season. In the 2008 season, the Dynamos finished runners-up.

Team Line-Up

Players

The squad as of 20 December 2004 is as follows.

Other Important team Personnel
  N S Sodhi (Chief Coach)
  Saurabh Bishnoi (assistant coach)
  Sarvesh Sharma (Physical Trainer)
  Amarjeet Singh (general manager)

Results

Note:- ET is win/loss in extra time

Indian field hockey clubs
Sport in Chandigarh
Premier Hockey League teams
Sports clubs in India
Sports clubs established in 2005
2005 establishments in Chandigarh